Women's uneven bars competition at the 2008 Summer Olympics was held on August 18 at the Beijing National Indoor Stadium.

The eight competitors (with a maximum of two per nation) with the highest scores in qualifying proceeded to the women's uneven bars finals. There, each gymnast performed again; the scores from the final round (ignoring qualification) determined final ranking.

Final
The final scores work as per the normal scoring procedure: the A score measures the difficulty of the routine and the B score measures how well it was executed. The B score has a maximum of 10.000 and is reduced for each deduction (for every error in the performance).

Tiebreaker
During the uneven bar finals, Nastia Liukin and He Kexin had a tied score of 16.725, which was followed by a tiebreaking procedure. In this procedure there are six judges who judge each competitor on a scale of 1-10. When all six scores are finalised, the highest and lowest are eliminated and the remaining four are averaged. The first tiebreaking procedure is determined by the E score, the execution score. Since Liukin and He tied with an E score of 9.025, the second tiebreaking procedure was required to determine a winner. In this event, the lowest score given to each competitor is dropped. Before this, the remaining scores were:

When the next lowest scores were deducted, the averages became:

Thus, since Nastia Liukin's average was lower after the second round of score elimination, He Kexin was declared the winner.

Qualified competitors

References

 Uneven bars final results
 Uneven bars qualification results

Gymnastics at the 2008 Summer Olympics
2008
2008 in women's gymnastics
Women's events at the 2008 Summer Olympics